"Cross My Heart" is a song by British MC Skepta, featuring vocals from actress and singer Preeya Kalidas. The song was released as a digital download on 17 October 2010 in the United Kingdom. It is the third single to be released from Skepta's third studio album, Doin' It Again (2011). The single will also feature on Kalidas' upcoming debut album, I'm Over It. On 24 October 2010 the song entered the UK Singles Chart at number 31 becoming Skepta's fourth highest-charted single, after "Rescue Me", That's Not Me and "Bad Boy".

Track listings

Chart performance

Weekly charts

Release history

References

2010 singles
Skepta songs
Preeya Kalidas songs
2010 songs
All Around the World Productions singles
Songs written by Skepta
3 Beat Records singles